Hearts Are Thumps is a 1937 Our Gang short comedy film directed by Gordon Douglas. It was the 152nd Our Gang short released (153rd episode, 64th talking short, and 65th talking episode). An audio clip from the short was included (out of sequence) in the beginning of the song "Tough Guys" by REO Speedwagon, from the album Hi Infidelity (1980).

Plot
Spanky, Alfalfa and Buckwheat have no interest in observing Valentine's Day. To prove it, Spanky establishes the He-Man Woman-Haters' Club in order to serve as their united front against the holiday. However, Alfalfa quickly abandons the club when Darla flirtatiously winks at him and proceeds to invite him to lunch to exchange Valentines. Spanky decides to teach his buddy a lesson by slipping soap into Alfalfa's lunch while he and Darla are away. Alfalfa stumbles through lunch as pleasantly as possible without offending Darla.

At the conclusion of recess, Darla encourages Alfalfa to sing while she plays "Let Me Call You Sweetheart" on the piano. After a drink of water to settle his upset stomach, Alfalfa warbles through the song as soap bubbles flow out of his mouth. As Alfalfa runs from the classroom upon finishing the song, a vindicated Spanky tears up Darla's valentine for Alfalfa.

Cast

The Gang
 Darla Hood as Darla
 George McFarland as Spanky
 Carl Switzer as Alfalfa
 Billie Thomas as Buckwheat
 Eugene Lee as Porky

Additional cast
 Shirley Coates as Henrietta
 Yoko Kawachichi as Asian girl
 Darwood Kaye as Waldo
 Sidney Kibrick as Woim
 Yoshi Nistu as Asian boy
 Rosina Lawrence as Miss Lawrence - the Teacher

Classroom extras
Beverley Baldey, Gloria Brown, Patty Brown, John Collum, Rex Downing, Elliott Fisher, Natalie Fisher, Joy Healey, Jackie Lindquist, Tommy McFarland, Beverley Lorraine Smith, Harold Switzer, Jerry Tucker, Robert Winckler

See also
 Our Gang filmography

References

External links

1937 films
1937 comedy films
1937 short films
American black-and-white films
Films directed by Gordon Douglas
Metro-Goldwyn-Mayer short films
Our Gang films
1930s American films